Captain Apollo is a fictional character in the Battlestar Galactica franchise. He was played by actor Richard Hatch in the original Battlestar Galactica series in 1978. Hatch who would also appear as Tom Zarek in the reimagined Battlestar Galactica miniseries in 2003.

Apollo is a Viper spacefighter pilot of the Battlestar Galactica, and the son of Commander Adama. (A diary entry from Adama in one of the novelizations based on the original television series says that he was named for one of Adama's squadron mates from his time aboard the battlestar Cerberus.)  His sister is Lieutenant Athena, and his mother was Ila. Apollo's history has been marred by tragedy. The loss of the Twelve Colonies deprived him of not only his home, but many of his personal relationships. His brother Zac was shot down by a Cylon ambush. Zac's viper was damaged, and Apollo left him behind in order to warn the Galactica of the ambush. His mother Ila was killed in the subsequent Cylon sneak attack. Later on, Apollo married Serina, a reporter-turned-shuttle-pilot who became a reserve Viper pilot. Shortly after their wedding, she was killed by Cylons on Kobol. Apollo then adopted Serina's son, Boxey, and became a single father to him.

In the final episode of the series, Apollo becomes romantically involved with Lieutenant Sheba. His best friend is Lieutenant Starbuck. 

Apollo is a central character of Battlestar Galactica, as many of the storylines and character relationships revolve around him.

Military career
Captain Apollo is the leader of Blue Squadron, an accomplished group of Viper pilots. In service of that calling, Apollo is a fearless warrior of distinction and a leader of firm resolve, whether in battle or in the face of political threats such as when he raids a guarded party of the important and corrupt member of the ruling Council of Twelve, Sir Uri, who is gorging on horded food supplies when other refugees in the refugee fleet were starving, regardless of warned retaliation. 

Among his accomplishments in the series are leading the mission to destroy the Madagon minefield, leading the assault on the pulsar cannon on Arkta, removing the renegade Cylon known as Red Eye, leading the paratroop assault on the Cylon city on Gamoray, leading the resistance against Count Iblis, helping to save Terra from the Eastern Alliance, and sneaking aboard a Cylon base ship to knock out its sensors so the Galactica could destroy it.

Apollo is notable for having died and then been revived. In the episode "War Of The Gods," a mysterious being called Count Iblis (Patrick Macnee, who also provided the voice of the Cylons's Imperious Leader and recited the series opening monologue) appears before the Fleet, demonstrates unusual powers, and begins to charm the Fleet into demanding him as their leader. Despite the "miracles" that Iblis produces, Apollo is suspicious of him and refuses to believe in his good intentions. This disbelief persists even in the face of opposition from most of the Fleet. Apollo seeks Adama's permission to examine the planet where Iblis was found, which Adama reluctantly grants. Apollo intends to go alone, but despite not sharing his disbelief, Starbuck insists on accompanying him. After a violent confrontation on the planet where Sheba's life is threatened, Iblis kills Apollo instead. As Sheba and Starbuck head back to the Galactica, they are intercepted by the Beings of Light, who not only revive Apollo but also provide the trio with coordinates to Earth.

Apollo always flies with Starbuck as his wingman. The exception is in the episode "Lost Planet Of The Gods," where he flies with Serina in her second and last mission as a Viper pilot. Starbuck and Apollo frequently fly with Lieutenant Boomer as a third wingman.

Richard Hatch's relaunch novel series, which continues the story of the Colonials after the TV series end, has Apollo becoming Commander of the Galactica after the death of his father Adama. The Maximum Press Battlestar Galactica comic book series published in the 1990s sees him taking command of the Galactica after his father is forced into cryogenic stasis to hold off a terminal illness. He also marries Sheba and has a son named Cain, after Sheba's father.

Galactica 1980
Like many of the stars of the original series, Richard Hatch was not available to work on the short lived sequel series Galactica 1980. As a result, the series was set many years in the future of the original show, and featured a grown Boxey now known as Captain Troy. Troy comments early in the first episode of Galactica 1980 that he missed both of his parents, and displayed a picture of Serina and Apollo, suggesting Apollo had died years before.

Notes
In early drafts of the Galactica scripts the Apollo character was named Skyler.

See also
Lee "Apollo" Adama, Captain Apollo's analog in the reimagined Battlestar Galactica.

External links 

  on Battlestar Wiki, a Battlestar Galactica Wiki
  (as depicted in comics, et al.) on Battlestar Wiki, a Battlestar Galactica Wiki

Battlestar Galactica (1978) characters
Fictional military captains